The men's tanding 75 kilograms competition at the 2018 Asian Games took place from 23 to 29 August 2018 at Padepokan Pencak Silat, Taman Mini Indonesia Indah, Jakarta, Indonesia.

Pencak silat is traditional Indonesian martial arts. Pencak silat is assessed from a punch, kick, sweep, and dings. The target that must be addressed is the patron in the body of every fighter who competed. Each judge gives an individual score for each competitor. The score given to each boxer would be taken from all 5 judges.

A total of ten competitors from ten different countries competed in this Class F event, limited to fighters whose body weight was less than 75 kilograms.

Trần Đình Nam from Vietnam won the gold medal after defeating Mohd Fauzi Khalid from Malaysia in the gold medal match by the score of 3–2. Daniiar Tokurov from Kyrgyzstan and Amri Rusdana from Indonesia finished third and won the bronze medal after losing in the semifinal.

Schedule
All times are Western Indonesia Time (UTC+07:00)

Results

References

External links
Official website

Men's tanding 75 kg